Insulin-like peptide 5 (INSL5) is a protein that in humans is encoded by the INSL5 gene.

Function 

The protein encoded by this gene contains a classical signature of the insulin superfamily and is highly similar to relaxin 3 (RLN3/INSL7).

References

Further reading

External links